The Mixed 10 metre air rifle prone SH1 event at the 2012 Summer Paralympics took take place on 1 September at the Royal Artillery Barracks in Woolwich.

The event consists of two rounds: a qualifier and a final. In the qualifier, each shooter fires 60 shots with an air rifle at 10 metres distance from the prone position. Scores for each shot are in increments of 1, with a maximum score of 10.

The top 8 shooters in the qualifying round move on to the final round. There, they fire an additional 10 shots. These shots score in increments of .1, with a maximum score of 10.9. The total score from all 70 shots is used to determine final ranking.

Qualification round

Q Qualified for final

Final

References

Shooting at the 2012 Summer Paralympics